Banū Taym (alternatively transliterated as Banu Taim or Banu Tahim) was a clan of the Quraysh tribe of Mecca. The first caliph, Abu Bakr, hailed from the Banu Taym, as did another prominent companion of Muhammad, Talha ibn Ubaydallah.

Ancestry
The tribe descended from Taym ibn Murrah ibn Ka'b ibn Lu'ay ibn Ghalib ibn Fihr ibn Malik ibn an-Nadr ibn Kinanah. Taym was a member of the Quraysh al-Bitah (i.e. Qurayshites living near the Kaaba in Mecca), and an uncle of the Qurayshite chief Qusayy ibn Kilab, who was a paternal ancestor of the prophet Muhammad.

Notable members

Abdullah "Abu Bakr" ibn Abi Quhafah, a senior companion (Sahabi) and father-in-law of the Islamic prophet Muhammad, ruling over the Rashidun Caliphate from 632 to 634 CE, when he became the first Muslim Caliph following Muhammad's death. 
Talha ibn Ubaidullah, a devoted disciple and companion of Muhammad. A paternal cousin of Abu Bakr.
Salma Umm al-Khair (died 632-634) female companion of Muhammad and mother of Abu Bakr al-Siddiq.
Uthman Abu Quhafa ibn Amir was a notable Muslim and the father of the Caliph Abu Bakr al-Siddiq.
Abdul-Rahman ibn Abi Bakr, the eldest son of Abu Bakr, the first caliph.
Abdullah ibn Abi Bakr, son of Qutaylah bint Abd-al-Uzza and Abu Bakr, the first Rashidun Caliph.
Aisha bint Abi Bakr, daughter of Abu Bakr and one of Muhammad's wives.

Muhammad ibn Abi Bakr Military General and Governor of Egypt under Caliph Ali (656–661).
Qasim ibn Muhammad ibn Abi Bakr was an important jurist in early Islam.
Asma bint Abdul-Rahman ibn Abi Bakr daughter of Abdul-Rahman and wife Qasim ibn Muhammad ibn Abu Bakr.
Umar ibn Ubayd Allah ibn Ma'mar, commander and governor under the Umayyads and Zubayrids.
Umm Farwah bint al-Qasim was the wife of Muhammad ibn Ali ibn al-Husayn ibn Ali ibn Abi Talib and the mother Ja'far ibn Muhammad al-Hashimi.
Fatima bint Muhammad, was the wife of Caliph Al-Mansur (r. 754–775) and mother of Sulayman .
Abu Najib Al-Din Suhrawardi, a renowned philosopher, scholar and theologian who founded the Suhrawardiyya sufi order.

Family tree

See also
Quraysh
Hijaz Mountains

References

Bibliography

 

Taym